Margaret Gale Kidwell (born August 17, 1933) is a British American evolutionary biologist and Regents’ Professor Emerita at the University of Arizona, Tucson. She grew up on a farm in the English Midlands during World War II. After graduating from the University of Nottingham in 1953, she worked in the British Civil Service as an Agricultural Advisory Officer from 1955-1960. She moved to the US in 1960 under the auspices of a Kellogg Foundation Fellowship to study Genetics and Statistics at Iowa State University. She married quantitative geneticist James F. Kidwell in 1961, obtained her MS degree in 1962 and moved with her husband to Brown University in 1963. She received her PhD from Brown University in 1973 under the guidance of Masatoshi Nei. From 1973 to 1984 she pursued independent research into a number of anomalous genetic phenomena in Drosophila which later lead to collaborative studies resulting in the discovery of hybrid dysgenesis and the isolation of transposable P elements. After appointment as Professor of Biology at Brown University in 1984 she moved to the University of Arizona in 1985 as Professor of Ecology and Evolutionary Biology. Additional positions included Chair of the Interdisciplinary Genetics Program from 1988-1991 and Head of the Department of Ecology and Evolutionary Biology from 1992-1997.  Research at the University of Arizona has increasingly focused on the evolutionary significance of transposable genetic elements. In 1996, she was the first woman from Arizona to be elected to the United States National Academy of Sciences

Honours and awards
Kidwell was elected fellow of the American Association for the Advancement of Science in 1992. In 1993 she was elected fellow of American Academy of Arts and Sciences. By 1994 she became a regent professor of Ecology and Evolutionary Biology at University of Arizona. She was a recipient of the Key Distinguished Lecture award for the American Genetic Association in 1991. She was also elected to the National Academy of Sciences in 1996.

Selected publications
 Kidwell, M. G.  1972. Genetic change of recombination value in Drosophila melanogaster: I.  Artificial selection for high and low recombination and some properties of recombination-modifying genes. Genetics 70: 419-432.
 Kidwell, M. G., J. F. Kidwell & M. Nei  1973. A case of high rate of spontaneous mutation affecting viability in Drosophila melanogaster. Genetics 75: 133-153.
 Kidwell, M. G., J. F. Kidwell & J. A. Sved  1977. Hybrid dysgenesis in D. melanogaster: a syndrome of aberrant traits including mutation, sterility & male recombination. Genetics 86: 813–833.
 Rubin, G. M., M. G. Kidwell & P. M. Bingham  1982. The molecular basis of P-M hybrid dysgenesis: The nature of induced mutations.  Cell 29: 987-994.
 Kidwell, M. G. 1983. Evolution of hybrid dysgenesis determinants in Drosophila melanogaster. Proc. Nat. Acad. Sci. USA 80: 1655-1659.
 Kidwell, M. G. and D. Lisch.  1997.  Transposable elements as sources of variation in animals and plants. Proc. Natl. Acad. Sci.  94: 7704-7711.
 Kidwell,  M. G. and D. R. Lisch  (2001)   Perspective: Transposable elements, parasitic DNA and genome evolution. Evolution 55:1-24.
 Kidwell, M. G. and D. R. Lisch  2017. Hybrid Dysgenesis. In Reference Module in Life  Sciences, Elsevier, Oxford.

References

Living people
21st-century American biologists
Women evolutionary biologists
University of Arizona faculty
Alumni of the University of Nottingham
Iowa State University alumni
Brown University alumni
1933 births